Stumptown is an unincorporated community on the eastern flanks of Catoctin Mountain in Loudoun County, Virginia, United States.

Unincorporated communities in Loudoun County, Virginia
Washington metropolitan area
Unincorporated communities in Virginia